The Supreme Court of the United States handed down six per curiam opinions during its 2012 term, which began October 1, 2012 and concluded October 6, 2013.

Because per curiam decisions are issued from the Court as an institution, these opinions all lack the attribution of authorship or joining votes to specific justices. All justices on the Court at the time the decision was handed down are assumed to have participated and concurred unless otherwise noted.

Court membership

Chief Justice: John Roberts

Associate Justices: Antonin Scalia, Anthony Kennedy, Clarence Thomas, Ruth Bader Ginsburg, Stephen Breyer, Samuel Alito, Sonia Sotomayor, Elena Kagan

Lefemine v. Wideman

Nitro-Lift Technologies, L. L. C. v. Howard

Marshall v. Rodgers

Boyer v. Louisiana

Nevada v. Jackson

Ryan v. Schad

See also 
 List of United States Supreme Court cases, volume 568
 List of United States Supreme Court cases, volume 569
 List of United States Supreme Court cases, volume 570

References

 

United States Supreme Court per curiam opinions
Lists of 2012 term United States Supreme Court opinions
2012 per curiam